Sir William Middleton 5th Baronet (1738–1795), was a British soldier and politician who sat in the House of Commons from 1774 to 1795.
 
Middleton was the son of Sir John Lambert Middleton, 4th Baronet of Belsay Castle, a former merchant, and his wife Anne Perkins, a widow and daughter of Sir Nathaniel Hodges,  and was born on 6 June 1738. He joined the Royal Horse Guards  and was Cornet in 1756 and Lieutenant in 1759. He was severely wounded at the Battle of Minden on 1 August 1759, and was  left lame for life. In 1762 he became captain.  He succeeded his father in the baronetcy on 2 March 1768 and retired from the army in 1774. He married Jane Monck, daughter of Lawrence Monck of Caenby, Lincolnshire on 20 April 1774,

In 1774 Middleton was elected as Member of Parliament for Northumberland in a contested election when he came second in the poll. He promised to act an independent and disinterested part in Parliament and generally did so. He was re-elected in 1780, 1784 and 1790. He is reported as attending parliament infrequently and never spoke.

Middleton  died on 7 July 1795.

References

 

1738 births
1795 deaths
British MPs 1774–1780
British MPs 1780–1784
British MPs 1784–1790
British MPs 1790–1796
Baronets in the Baronetage of England
Royal Horse Guards officers
Members of the Parliament of Great Britain for English constituencies